In Canada, an allophone is a resident whose first language is neither French nor English. The term parallels anglophone and francophone, which designate people whose mother tongues are  English and French, respectively. Some sources do not consider native speakers of Indigenous languages to be allophones.

Origin of term

The term became popularized during the Quiet Revolution as French Canadian society in Quebec sought to integrate immigrants, most of whom had traditionally integrated into the English-speaking community. As integrating immigrants was deemed essential to assure the survival of French-speaking Quebec in light of plummeting birth rates, demographers devised this category to monitor the integration of immigrants into French- and English-speaking communities. Because allophones often adopt English, French, or both languages at home or learn one language before another, they can be grouped into English or French communities based on home language or first official language learned.

Demographics
In 2006, 20% of the population of Canada was allophone.

Ontario
In 2001, 24.2% of the population of Ontario was allophone.

Quebec

Allophones constitute an increasing share of the Quebec population and are the main source of population increase in the province, reflecting both increased levels of immigration, declining birthrates among established anglophone and francophone populations, and a shift in immigration from English-speaking countries to Asia and the Americas. In 1971, allophones were 6.6% of the population. By 2001, this had increased to 10.0%. Speakers of Arabic, Spanish, and Haitian Creole experienced the greatest growth from 1996 to 2001.

Increasing numbers of allophones speak French at home: about 20.4% of allophones in the province reported that they spoke French most often at home in 2001, compared with 16.6% in 1996, and 15.4% in 1991. Most allophones live in Montreal, Quebec's largest metropolitan area. They tend to migrate out of the province: between 1996 and 2001, over 19,170 migrated to other provinces, 18,810 of those to Ontario.

Most allophone students in Quebec attend francophone schools.

See also
 Official bilingualism in Canada
 Languages of Canada

References

External links
 Government of Canada, Secretariat for Official Language Minority Communities

Political terminology in Canada
Languages of Canada
Sociolinguistics